Tahir Pasha, (died 1913) was an Ottoman Brigadier General (mirliva) who originated from the region of Krajë, now in modern Montenegro and he was an Albanian. He served as governor of Mosul and Bitlis toward the latter years of his life.

Background
Tahir Pasha entered the service of the Ottoman crown prince prior to 1876 and became his confidant. After the prince became sultan Abdul Hamid II he remained with him until the end of his reign. While Abdul Hamid II was in power, Tahir Pasha headed the palace guard and attained the rank of marshall, due to the growth of his protection force and responsibilities. Tahir Pasha served as a vali or governor of Mosul in the Ottoman Empire from 1889 to 1891. Then he was the vali of Van and Bitlis, Turkey. 

Cevdet Bey, his first son, was a leader of the Committee of Union and Progress (CUP) and was also vali of Van. Cevdet's brother-in-law was Enver Pasha, who established a department whose mission was to "free all the Islamic lands from foreign influence". Governors of "frontier provinces", like Van and Mosul, were specially picked for their positions and worked in conjunction with this department established as part of the Ministry of War. The goals was to create "free and independent Muslim states".

Prior to 1918, Enver Pasha was the Young Turks political movement leader.

Pasha kept a library of journals, newspapers and books about Islam, Ottoman culture, current affairs, astronomy, mathematics, geology, geography, history, chemistry, physics, and philosophy. He was a mentor or teacher, organizing contests on subjects like mathematics. One of his students, Molla Said, dressed haphazardly and refused Pasha's offer that, if Said would dress as a religious scholar, Pasha would allow him to wed his daughter and give him a house and 1000 gold liras.

Pasha was quite upset by a newspaper article that mentioned his concern about Europe's intentions towards Muslims and a quote that in order to dominate people of the Muslim faith, they must either change their religion convictions or take them away from them.

Career
Tahir Pasha transferred from Van to Bitlis about the time of the Turkish Tax Revolts of 1906–1907. The previous vali, Salim Pasha, was considered "able and energetic" and Tahir had made financial decisions that were not previously under the governor's domain. For instance, he was ignoring "depredations" against the Kurdish people.  His time was sent on diverting funding from Armenian schools elsewhere. There was also an increase in murders during his rule. Repeated calls to fire Tahir were made to the Committee of Union and Progress (CUP) by the Kurdish and Armenian communities, particularly the Armenian Revolutionary Federation (ARF), and governmental personnel. Having originally believed that Pasha was a constitutionalist (wanting restoration of the Ottoman constitution of 1876), by March 1910 CUP was in agreement that a change in leadership was necessary. In July it was announced that Tahir's replacement would be Ismael Hakki, who was vali of Isgeti.

See also
 Elyesa Bazna
 Adana massacre (1909)
 Young Turk Revolution (1908)

References

Further reading
 
 

Pashas
Albanians from the Ottoman Empire
19th-century births
1913 deaths
Governors of the Ottoman Empire
Ottoman governors of Mosul